Jack Sanborn (born July 29, 2000) is an American football linebacker for the Chicago Bears of the National Football League (NFL). He played college football at Wisconsin.

Early life and high school career
Sanborn grew up in Deer Park, Illinois. He was raised by his mother following the death of his father, Paul Sanborn, when he was four years old. Sanborn attended Lake Zurich High School in Lake Zurich, Illinois. As a senior, he was named the Pioneer Press Defensive Player of the Year after recording 120 tackles and three sacks as a senior. Sanborn had 296 tackles and 13 sacks in three varsity seasons at Lake Zurich. He was rated a four-star recruit and committed to play college football at Wisconsin over numerous Power 5 offers.

College career
Sanborn played in 11 games as a freshman. He was Wisconsin's leading tackler in sophomore season with 80 along with nine tackles for loss and 5.5 sacks. As a junior, Sanborn led the Badgers for a second straight season with 52 tackles and had four tackles for loss, one sack, one forced fumble and one interception and was named third-team All-Big Ten Conference. He was named first-team All-Big Ten as a senior after recording 91 tackles, 16 tackles for loss, and five sacks. Following the end of the season, Sanborn announced that he would be entering the 2022 NFL Draft.

Professional career
Sanborn signed with the Chicago Bears as an undrafted free agent on May 6, 2022. Sanborn eventually made the Bears' 53-man roster for the 2022 season. He became the Bears' starting middle linebacker following the trade of Roquan Smith. On November 13, during his first career start, Sanborn recorded two sacks and 12 total tackles during a 31–30 loss to the Detroit Lions. Sanborn would have also recorded an interception on Detroit Lions quarterback Jared Goff in his NFL starting debut, but it was called back by a penalty. On December 18, Sanborn suffered a season-ending ankle injury in the Bears' 25–20 loss to the Philadelphia Eagles, and was placed on injured reserve on December 20. He made six starts for the Bears in 2022, where he recorded 64 total tackles and two sacks. Pro Football Focus (PFF) named Sanborn to their 2022 All-Rookie Team following the regular season.

Career statistics

Personal life
Sanborn's father played college football as an offensive lineman for the University of Oregon. His younger brother, Bryan, also plays linebacker at Wisconsin.

References

External links

Chicago Bears bio
Wisconsin Badgers bio

2000 births
Living people
Players of American football from Illinois
Sportspeople from Cook County, Illinois
American football linebackers
Wisconsin Badgers football players
Chicago Bears players